Dal Shealy (born August 1, 1938) is a former American football player and coach.  He served as the head coach at Mars Hill College—now known as Mars Hill University—in 1969, Carson–Newman College—now known as Carson–Newman University—from 1970 to 1973, and at the University of Richmond from 1980 to 1988, compiling a career college football record of 79–74.  Shealy also served as an assistant coach at Baylor University, the University of Tennessee, Auburn University, and Iowa State University.  He grew up in Batesburg, South Carolina, now Batesburg-Leesville, South Carolina and attended Batesburg-Leesville High School and Carson–Newman College—now known as Carson–Newman University. Shealy's son, Vic Shealy, is currently the head football coach at Houston Baptist University.

Early life and military service
Shealy earned a total of 12 varsity letters in three sports (football, baseball and basketball) at Batesburg-Leesville High School in the 1950s.  Shealy played on the line for the Panthers in football for coach Gus Allen along with catching for the baseball team. Shealy was a part of the inaugural class of the Batesburg-Leesville (SC) Athletic Hall of Fame in 2009.

Shealy entered the United States Marine Corps and played football with the Quantico Marines, which were National Service Champions. They played in the Leatherneck Bowl and the first Missile Bowl.   At Quantico, played with King Dixon, former halfback at the University of South Carolina. Dixon later served as athletic director at South Carolina.

Coaching career
Shealy was the head football coach at Laurens High School in Laurens, South Carolina from 1962 to 1964.  In May 1965, he was hired by Mars Hill College—now known as Mars Hill University—in Mars Hill, North Carolina as head track coach, ends coach for the football team, and director of the men's intramural athletics program.

Life after coaching
Shealy left coaching in 1989 to become executive vice president of the Fellowship of Christian Athletes. He was named president in 1992. He retired from the presidency in 2005. Shealy has also written several books including, "One Way To Play: Drug-Free!" and "One Way To Play: A Game Plan for Coaches."

Head coaching record

College football

References

External links
 American Football Coaches Foundation profile
 South Carolina Football Hall of Fame profile

1938 births
Living people
American football guards
Auburn Tigers football coaches
Baylor Bears football coaches
Carson–Newman Eagles football coaches
Carson–Newman Eagles football players
Iowa State Cyclones football coaches
Mars Hill Lions football coaches
Quantico Marines Devil Dogs football players
Richmond Spiders football coaches
Tennessee Volunteers football coaches
College track and field coaches in the United States
High school football coaches in South Carolina
People from Batesburg-Leesville, South Carolina
Coaches of American football from South Carolina
Players of American football from South Carolina